Juglone, also called 5-hydroxy-1,4-naphthalenedione (IUPAC) is an organic compound with the molecular formula C10H6O3.  In the food industry, juglone is also known as C.I. Natural Brown 7 and C.I. 75500.   It is insoluble in benzene but soluble in dioxane, from which it crystallizes as yellow needles. It is an isomer of lawsone, which is the staining compound in the henna leaf.

Juglone occurs naturally in the leaves, roots, husks, fruit (the epicarp), and bark of plants in the Juglandaceae family, particularly the black walnut (Juglans nigra), and is toxic or growth-stunting to many types of plants. It is sometimes used as an herbicide, as a dye for cloth and inks, and as a coloring agent for foods and cosmetics.

History
The harmful effects of walnut trees on other plants have been observed for at least two millennia. The ancient civilizations of Greece and Rome used the walnut for its cytotoxic properties as did residents of the American South for easily gathering fish when they threw cut husks into the water with the fish. However, juglone was not isolated until the 1850s. Two men, A. Vogel Jr. and C. Reischauer, were able to isolate the compound from the walnut tree in 1851. The compound was known as nucin at that time. Juglone was then synthesized and characterized for the first time in 1887 by A. Bernthsen and A. Semper.

While at the Virginia Agricultural Experiment Station in 1921, M.T. Cook found that tomato plants in the vicinity of Juglans nigra were negatively affected, most notably by their wilted leaves. Schneiderhan found that Juglans nigra and Juglans cinerea were damaging apple trees in Virginia. The trees that were within an average of 11.9 meters from the walnut trees were found dead. All damaged trees in their vicinity average about 14.3 meters away. In addition, he found that certain local variations of the apple trees tended to be more resistant to the walnuts.

A.B. Massey observed that the walnut trees in alfalfa fields caused the alfalfa to die away in place of grass. After several other experiments, Massey concluded that the toxic compound found in walnut trees was not easily soluble in water, so the compound in the roots and bark must change chemically after it leaves the tree. It was not until 1928 the compound was identified and confirmed to be toxic to other plants by E.F. Davis.

After the scientific news of the harm walnut trees caused certain crops and trees, there was backlash from the scientific community to refute these findings. On one account, A.G. Miller claimed that the trees that Schneiderhan observed to be harming the apple trees in Virginia were not in fact walnut trees.

By 1942, B.I. Brown showed that tomato and alfalfa germination and seedling growth was slowed down by being in contact with pieces of walnut roots, adding further scientific evidence to the biological damage of juglone.

The walnut tree has historically been used within the field of traditional medicine. In America during the early 1900s, doctors prescribed juglone for the treatment of various skin diseases.

Chemistry

Synthesis
Juglone is derived by oxidation of hydrojuglone, 1,5-dihydroxynaphthalene, after enzymatic hydrolysis. It can also be obtained by oxidations of 5,8-dihydroxy-1-tetralone with silver oxide (Ag2O), manganese dioxide (MnO2), or  2,3-dichloro-5,6-dicyano-1,4-benzoquinone (DDQ).

Extraction
Juglone has been extracted from the husk of walnut fruit of which it contains 2-4% by fresh weight.

Degradation 
Before oxidization, juglone exists in plants such as walnuts in the form of colorless hydroxyjuglone, with both O groups replaced with OH groups.  This is rapidly oxidized to juglone once exposed to air.  The evidence that hydroxyjuglone is readily degraded is most apparent in the color change of walnut hulls from yellow to black after being freshly cut.

Indigenous bacteria found in the soil of black walnut roots, most notably Pseudomonas putida J1, are able to metabolize juglone and use it as their primary source of energy and carbon. Because of this, juglone is not so active as a cytotoxin in well-aerated soils.

Biological effects
Juglone is an allelopathic compound, a substance produced by a plant to stunt the growth of another plant. Juglone affects germination of plants less than it affects growth of the root and stem systems. In below average concentrations, it has increased the rate of germination in some coniferous seeds.

Juglone exerts its effect by inhibiting certain enzymes needed for metabolic function. This in turn inhibits the effects of respiration of mitochondria and inhibits photosynthesis found in common crops such as maize and soy at juglone concentrations that are at or below those common in nature. In addition to these inhibitions, juglone has been shown to alter the relationship between plants and water because of its effect on stomatal functioning.

The rise in popularity of alley cropping with black walnut trees and maize in the American Midwest, due to the high value of black walnut trees, has led to certain studies being conducted about the particular relationship between the two species. Research has shown that juglone affects the yield of maize crops; however, the practice of pruning and usage of root barriers greatly reduce these effects.

Some plants and trees are resistant to juglone including some species of maple (Acer), birch (Betula), and beech (Fagus).

It is highly toxic to many insect herbivores. However, some of them, example Actias luna (Luna moth), can detoxify juglone (and related naphthoquinones) to non-toxic 1,4,5-trihydroxynaphthalene. It has also shown anthelmintic (expelling parasitic worms) activity on mature and immature Hymenolepis nana in mice. Napthoquinonic compounds also exhibit antimicrobial activity.

Juglone has been studied for its anticancer properties.  It has been shown to decrease the probability of intestinal tumors in rats that have been exposed to carcinogens. One of the potential pathways through which juglone achieves its anticancer properties is through the formation of the semiquinone radical; the semiquinone radical causes superoxide anion radicals to form which can lead to apoptosis when present in large concentrations. This conversion from juglone to semiquinone radical that causes the superoxide anion radical to form takes place in the mitochondria as well as the cytosol.

Uses
Juglone is occasionally used as a herbicide. Traditionally, juglone has been used as a natural dye for clothing and fabrics, particularly wool, and as ink.  Because of its tendency to create dark orange-brown stains, juglone has also found use as a coloring agent for foods and cosmetics, such as hair dyes.

Spectral data
The spectral data for juglone are consistent with the structure. The IR spectrum for juglone shows peaks at 3400, 1662, and 1641 cm−1 which are characteristic respectively of the hydroxyl and two carbonyl groups. The 13C NMR spectrum shows 10 peaks, including signals at 160.6, 183.2, and 189.3 ppm for the hydroxyl and two carbonyl carbons.

See also 
 Plumbagin

References 

Herbicides
Natural dyes
Food colorings
1,4-Naphthoquinones
Hydroxynaphthoquinones